The Last Word or Last Word may refer to:

Film
 The Last Word (1973 film), a Bulgarian film directed by Binka Zhelyazkova
 The Last Word (1975 film), a German film
 The Last Word (1979 film), a film directed by Roy Boulting
 The Last Word (1995 film), a film directed by Tony Spiridakis
 The Last Word (2003 film), a film starring Mary Lucia
 The Last Word (2008 film), a film starring Wes Bentley and Winona Ryder
 The Last Word, a 2008 documentary film about Johnny Frank Garrett
 Johnny Frank Garrett's Last Word, a 2016 fictional film based on the documentary
 The Last Word (2009 film), an Iranian film
 The Last Word, a former title of Perfect Sense, a 2011 film starring Eva Green and Ewan McGregor 
 The Last Word (2017 film), a film starring Shirley MacLaine and Amanda Seyfried

Literature
 "The Last Word" (Knight short story), a 1957 story by Damon Knight
 "The Last Word" (Greene short story), a 1988 story by Graham Greene
The Last Word, novel by Hanif Kureishi
 Last Word: My Indictment of the CIA in the Murder of JFK, a 2011 book by Mark Lane
 "Last Word", a section of the magazine New Scientist
 "The Last Word", a back-page column written by the editor in chief of the State Magazine

Radio
 The Last Word (radio show), an Irish news and discussion programme
 Last Word, an obituary radio series on BBC Radio 4

Television

Series
 The Last Word (2020 TV series) (German: Das letzte Wort), a German drama series
 The Last Word (Australian TV program), an Australian news panel discussion program
 The Last Word (Malaysian TV series), a Malaysian lifestyle show
 The Last Word (game show), a 1989 Canadian/American game show
 The Last Word with Lawrence O'Donnell, an American news program on MSNBC
 The Last Word, a sports interview program hosted by Jim Rome
 The Last Word, a 1982–83 late-night American network TV program

Episodes
 "The Last Word" (The Closer), 2012
 "Last Word" (The L Word), 2009

Other uses
 Last word (cocktail), a gin-based prohibition-era cocktail
 The Last Word, an album by the O'Jays, 2019

See also
 Last words, last words said before death
 Last words (disambiguation)
 Famous Last Words (disambiguation)
 The Final Word (disambiguation)